Serrata boucheti is a species of sea snail, a marine gastropod mollusk in the family Marginellidae, the margin snails.

Description
The length of the shell attains 5.15 mm.

Distribution
This marine species occurs off New Caledonia

References

 Boyer F. (2001). Espèces nouvelles de Marginellidae du niveau bathyal de la Nouvelle-Calédonie. Novapex 2(4): 157-169 
 Boyer, F. (2008). The genus Serrata Jousseaume, 1875 (Caenogastropoda: Marginellidae) in New Caledonia. in: Héros, V. et al. (Ed.) Tropical Deep-Sea Benthos 25. Mémoires du Muséum national d'Histoire naturelle (1993). 196: 389-436

Marginellidae
Gastropods described in 2001